Oosthuizen is a village in the Dutch province of North Holland. It is a part of the municipality of Edam-Volendam, and lies about 8 km north of Purmerend.

History 
The village was first mentioned in the 12th century as "in Asthusa minore", and means "eastern houses". Minor or luttic was often added to distinguish from Grosthuizen. Oosthuizen started as a peat excavation settlement in the Zeevang polder. In 1292, it became a free heerlijkheid (=no fief).

The Dutch Reformed church is cruciform church with ridge turret. The choir and transept were constructed in 1511. The nave is from 1518. The Catholic Franciscus van Assisi Church is a residential home which was converted to church in 1960.

Oosthuizen was home to 634 people in 1840. It was a separate municipality until 1970, when the new municipality of Zeevang was created. It was the capital of Zeevang. In 2016, it became part of the municipality of Edam-Volendam.

Notable people
Adriaan de Bruin (ca. 1700-1766), enslaved servant of the Dutch politician Adriaan van Bredehoff.

Gallery

References

External links

Populated places in North Holland
Former municipalities of North Holland
Geography of Edam-Volendam